The 2011 edition of the UNAF U-17 Tournament took place in December 2011. Morocco hosted the tournament.

Participants
 (host)

 (invited)

Stadium
 Prince Moulay Hassan Stadium, Rabat (15,000)

Knockout stage
All times given as local time (UTC+0)

Semi-finals

Third place match

Final

Champions

References

External links
 2011 UNAF U-17 Tournament - unaf-foot.com

2011 in African football
2011
2009
2011–12 in Algerian football
2011–12 in Tunisian football
2011–12 in Moroccan football